Daraga, officially the Municipality of Daraga, is a 1st class municipality in the province of Albay, Philippines. According to the 2020 census, it has a population of 133,893.

The municipality is home to the famous Cagsawa Ruins.

History
The word daraga historically referred to a "maiden", and is the modern term for an "unmarried woman" in many of the Bikol languages. The original settlement of Daraga dates back to the 12th century, but has changed location repeatedly due to the constant threats posed by the Mayon Volcano. The town was previously named Budiao, Cagsawa, and Locsin.

Cityhood

House Bill No. 1528 was filed last July 4, 2019, for the conversion of the municipality of Daraga into a component city in the province of Albay. The bill is currently pending with the committee on local government since July 24, 2019.

Geography 
It is roughly "boot-shaped", with the "tall" part ranging 13.05–13.25° north latitude and 123.66–123.73° east longitude and the "wide" part ranging 13.02–13.09° north latitude and 123.56–123.71° east longitude. It is bounded on the north and east by Legazpi City, south by Sorsogon (particularly the municipality of Pilar), and west by Camalig, and Jovellar.

According to the Philippine Statistics Authority, the municipality has a land area of  constituting  of the  total area of Albay. This municipal land area is distributed among the present 16 urban barangays and 42 rural barangays. The urban barangays total  (12.65%) and the rural barangays make up the remaining  (87.35%) of the total municipal land area.

Elevation 
The surface terrain is generally characterized by combination of level to nearly level areas, gentle to undulating areas and undulating to rolling areas.

Soil 
The different soil types to be found within Daraga are the Mayon Gravelly Sandy Loam, Annam Clay Loam, Gravelly Sandy Loam, Legazpi Fine Sandy Loam (Stoney Phase), Sevilla Clay Loam and Sevilla Clay.

The underlying geology are made up of several types: Alluvium, Shale and Sandstone Limestone and Basalt and Andesite Series. The prevalent geologic type is the Shale and Sandstone Sequence and other equally significant geologic types such as alluvium. Recent Volcanic, Crystalline Limestone and Psyroclastine Limestone are found near the base of Mayon Volcano mostly in the urban barangays.

Minerals available within the municipality of Daraga are non-metallic consisting of Gravel, and Boulders. These minerals are abundant in Barangays Budiao, Busay, Bañadero and Matnog brought down from the slopes of Mayon Volcano during occurrences of volcanic eruptions and rains.

Drainage 
The surface drainage pattern of Daraga is largely affected by the water runoff coming from Mayon Volcano coupled with those from other directions. Major river systems which convey and act as natural drainage channels as well as water sources include:

 Yawa River in Barangay Cullat, Malobago, Kilicao, Tagas, Binitayan & Bañag which connects to the Albay Gulf in Legazpi City
 Colabos Creek in Bañag, San Roque, Market Area, Sagpon, and Bagumbayan
 Quillarena River in Malabog & Budiao
 Gumacon Creek in Barangay Maroroy, Tagas
 Gulang-Gulang Creek in Barangay Pandan

Climate 

Daraga has a generally wet climate characterized by a lack of the dry season. Prevailing winds are generally from north-east to south-west.

But the climate change phenomenon has changed the past climate pattern. Dry spells are becoming more pronounced, as it is with the wet season. The phenomenon is felt all over the country as well.

Barangays
Daraga is politically subdivided into 54 barangays.

Demographics

In the 2020 census, Daraga had a population of 133,893.

In 2010, the 2010 municipal population of 115,804 was distributed among the urban and rural Barangays. The urban population was 48.54% while rural population completed the remaining 51.45%. The "built-up density" was 5,659 persons/km2. It had a literacy rate of 96.08% and a municipality growth rate of 1.3%.

In terms of employment and livelihood, farming ranks high at 33.53%, crafts and related workers as well as elementary occupations follow second with 17.71% and 21.89% respectively.

Language
The languages spoken in Daraga include East Miraya (Daragueño), Bicol, Tagalog, and English.

Economy

Daraga's economy, originally agriculture-based, has rapidly transformed into an emerging urban system, benefiting from the economic opportunities of being located contiguously with the urban center of Legazpi. It draws trade relations with the island province of Masbate through the nearby Port of Pilar.

Daraga is the site of the Bicol International Airport which will further boost tourism in the region and will introduce more opportunities especially in this town. Local officials are now considering cityhood in the near future or upon the completion of the said international airport, if that so, Daraga would be the fourth city in Albay.

Daraga has the highest number of business establishments among towns in Albay. As of 2011 it has over 2,300 business establishments registered with the Permits and Licensing Office. The municipality is a center of handicraft manufacturing with several handicraft factories choosing their location in the municipality.

Government
The current town mayor is Carlwyn “Awin” G. Baldo.

Tourism

Daraga's existing tourist spots/attractions are the Cagsawa Ruins and Resort and the Our Lady of the Gate Parish.

Cagsawa Ruins and Resort is located in Barangay Busay. Its prominent attraction is the belfry of the Cagsawa Church which submerged in mudflow during the February 2, 1814, Mayon Volcano Eruption which killed 1,200 people.

The Our Lady of the Gate Parish was constructed in 1773 atop Santa Maria Hill in Barangay San Roque and is uniquely known for its rich Baroque architecture.

Transportation 
These are categorized as national roads, provincial roads, municipal roads and barangay roads. The barangay roads comprise the bulk of the municipality road network system. About 24.97% are concrete paved while the remaining 75.03% remains in asphalt, gravel or earth fill pavement conditions. These are about 25 bridges within the municipality and 66.22% of which are within barangay roads while the other bridges are part of national, provincial or barangay roads.

Daraga is the site of the newly constructed Bicol International Airport. It serves the City of Legazpi and the rest of Albay. It is located at barangay Alobo.

Education

Elementary

Each barangay of Daraga has its own elementary school.

High school

 Anislag National High School
 Anislag National High School - Bascaran HS Extension
 Anislag National High School - San Vicente Grande HS Extension
 Banadero National High School
 Bicol College (BC) - High School Department.
 Daraga National High School (DNHS)
 Immaculate Concepcion College of Albay (ICCA) - High School Department
 Kilicao High School
 Lacag National High School
 Malabog National High School
 Mary's Child Science Oriented School (MCSOS) - High School Department
 United Institute (U.I.) - High School Department

College
 Bicol University – Daraga
 Belen B. Francisco Foundation Inc.
 Bicol College (BC)
 Daraga Community College (DComC)
 Immaculate Concepcion College of Albay (ICCA)

References

External links

 [ Philippine Standard Geographic Code]

Municipalities of Albay